He Died with a Felafel in His Hand is a 2001 Australian comedy-drama film directed by Richard Lowenstein and starring Noah Taylor. The film draws on the 1994 memoir of the same name and consists of a series of vignettes from a young man's experience of sharing accommodation with a variety of characters. There also exists a graphic adaptation of the novel.

Plot

Prologue

Danny (Noah Taylor), enters the lounge of his Sydney flat late at night and discovers that his roommate Flip (Brett Stewart) has died in front of the TV holding a felafel kebab.

House #47: Brisbane, Australia

Nine months prior, Danny and Flip are sharing a house in Brisbane, with housemates Taylor (Alex Menglet), Milo (Damian Walshe-Howling), Otis (Torquil Neilson), Sam (Emily Hamilton), Jabber (Haskel Daniel), and Derek (Robert Rimmer). Anya (Romane Bohringer), arrives and becomes a new housemate. Later that night, Milo and Otis set the rules for a contest to see which of them can successfully romance Anya. The next day, a pair of thugs (Linal Haft and Nathan Kotzur) show up at the house and threaten them for not paying their rent. Anya asks to invite some friends over for a party. The next morning, Danny types out a horror story about masturbation and posts it to Penthouse. While checking the mail, he is devastated to find an invitation to his ex-girlfriend's wedding. A young Japanese girl, Satomi (Sayuri Tanoue), who speaks little English, comes in, declaring, "I move in now." After Satomi produces a wad of cash, Sam offers to let her stay in a narrow storage closet in the screened veranda surrounding the house. Anya's party turns out to be a pagan ritual, and a drunk Milo gets tied to the pole of the washing line. Taylor also invites over a gang of skinheads to help confront the landlord's thugs. Milo escapes from the neopagans as the skinheads start looting and vandalizing the house with chainsaws. Anya kisses Sam just as the skinheads manage to remove the entire back wall of the house. Danny quickly packs his belongings, leaves his boom box with Flip, and departs.

House #48: Melbourne, Australia

Three months later, Danny is living in Melbourne with a housemate named Iain (Ian Hughes). Danny attends the outdoor wedding of his ex-girlfriend (Pascal Delair) and best friend (Stuart Nicholls) in the pouring rain. When he arrives back home, Taylor and Flip arrive. Taylor expresses his pleasure at having discovered the joys of hiring prostitutes. Later, Sam also shows up after fleeing from an argument with Anya. Taylor checks the telephone directory for local prostitutes. Sam lies in bed with Danny and asks him to make love. Danny declines on the grounds that "we're mates." Danny is awakened in the middle of the night by loud music. He discovers Sam in the bath with her wrists cut. Danny comforts her, and she kisses him. In the morning, the two are awakened by two policemen (Tim Robertson and Robert Morgan), who drag in an unconscious Taylor and lecture Danny about morality. The policemen line up Danny, Sam, Flip, and Iain in the lounge to interrogate them. The cops threaten them, checking all their arms for heroin needle track marks and declares Flip a "pincushion." Danny asks Flip what's going on, but Flip reveals he has checked into a rehab bootcamp. The policemen reveal that Taylor had stolen Danny's credit card and charged over $8000 to it during a night of drunken mayhem. They also tell Danny that he owes more than $7,000 to the Brisbane landlord. Iain demands a lawyer and one of the cops draws his gun. Iain panics grabs for the gun, and gets shot in the ear. The cop warns Danny to be careful and Danny takes it as a threat, deciding to leave.

House #49: Sydney, Australia

Three months later, Danny is living in a tidy flat in Sydney with housemates Nina (Sophie Lee), 'Uptight Ivan' (Ivan Tatarovic), Dirk (Francis McMahon), and Taylor. Danny notices a newspaper article saying that Melbourne police have been cleared of responsibility for Iain's shooting. Sam arrives and moves into the spare room. An agent (Clayton Jacobson) from a department store credit bureau arrives, looking for a "Mr. Corcoran." Danny shows the man a drawer full of collection letters addressed to Robert J. Corcoran. Anya arrives, and soon after, so does a policewoman, Sgt. P. O'Neill (Skye Wansey), also looking for Corcoran. Anya and Sam argue about their broken relationship, which quickly escalates into loud sex. Nina urges Danny to get rid of them. Danny tells Anya that he just wants to be left alone, but Anya begins kissing him passionately. Sam appears at the door and sees them. Sam begins angrily packing her things while Danny apologizes. Sam declares Anya a "chaos freak" and heads out the door.

The roommates all complain to themselves about their problems. Dirk enters to declare that he is gay, but is disappointed by the lack of reaction from the roommates, who had all assumed as much. Danny loses his temper with Dirk, urging Dirk to chill out, since he is not the only one with problems. Danny then locks himself in his bedroom with a telephone sitting on his chest. Taylor slides food to him under the door. Several hours later, Anya slides a cigarette through, and, sitting on the other side of the door, tells Danny a story about lovers, the plot of Solaris. Danny takes the cigarette. Taylor discovers that Penthouse has published Danny's story. As Taylor gives Danny the good news, Flip arrives at the door, and reveals that he has left rehab. Sgt. O'Neill arrives with a partner (Simon Wheeler). She adds up the amount due in Corcoran's bills as $24,974 and issues a summons to Danny to appear in court. At night, Danny tells Flip that he is going to be sent to prison for credit fraud, but Flip says he needs Danny because he is the only friend he has who is not on drugs. Flip leaves Danny's room to get something to eat.

Later that night, Danny starts packing his things in a milk crate. Loud music catches his attention, and he discovers Flip dead in front of the TV. A pair of cops declare Flip a "typical bloody junkie" and cover his body with a sheet, telling Danny not to touch anything. As the sun rises, Danny leaves with his typewriter, catches a ferry, and drops his typewriter into Sydney Harbour. Later, Sam encounters Danny asleep in front of her door, who, after waking him up, tells her that Flip has died. Danny and all of his former roommates hold a memorial service for Flip. Each leaves a memento on a charcoal fire in a kettle grill in which Flip's ashes have been dumped. Danny sacrifices his old boombox. Nina throws several credit cards in Robert J. Corcoran's name on the fire. Anya gives Danny a cheque, ostensibly from Penthouse, and Nina declares that she and Anya, now a couple, are going to Paris together, where Nina hopes to be a successful actor. Danny calls Sgt. O'Neill and identifies Nina as Robert J. Corcoran, and he and Sam set off down the street together.

Cast

Noah Taylor as Daniel "Danny" Kirkhope
Emily Hamilton as Sam
Romane Bohringer as Anya
Alex Menglet as Taylor
Brett Stewart (actor) as Flip
Damian Walshe-Howling as Milo
Torquil Neilson as Otis
Sophie Lee as Nina
Francis McMahon as Dirk
Ian Hughes as Iain the Socialist
Robert Rimmer as Derek the Bank Clerk
Sayuri Tanoue as Satomi Tiger
Linal Haft	as Brisbane Goon 1
Nathan Kotzur as Brisbane Goon 2
Haskel Daniel as Jabber
Skye Wansey as Detective O'Neill
Ivan Tatarovic as 'Uptight Ivan'
Tim Robertson as Melbourne Detective 1
Robert Morgan as Melbourne Detective 2
Clayton Jacobson as Repo Man
Scott Major as Welfare Officer
Pascal Delair as the Bride
Wendy Roberts as Cashmere Sweater Babe
Graeme Carroll as Rugby man
Terry Serio as Sydney Policeman 1
Steve Bastoni as Sydney Policeman 2
Chris Samios as Young Singing Skin
Keeryn Gill as Walking Mother
Benjamin Rich as Baby in Stroller
Rani Hayman as Flower girl
Stuart Nicholls as Groom
Harry Brentnall as Groomsman
Norris Blanks as Male Guest
Jilly Ferguson as Female Guest
Jon Wicks as Photographer
Simon Wheeler as O'Neill's Partner
Matt Dunk as Dirk's Friend
Michael Fawaz as Taxi Driver
Skye Gamblin as Cashmere Sweater orgasmic vocal
Glenn Newnham as Brisbane Landlord phone vocal

Box office

The film He Died with a Felafel in His Hand grossed $820,999 at the box office in Australia.

Differences between the book and the film
The book is in the form of a memoir of experiences living in shared accommodations, presumably from the point of view of John Birmingham. The film, on the other hand, tells a fictional story in episodic or anecdotal form. But the book is much more episodic, anecdotal, and fragmented than the story of the film, with frequent interpolations of anecdotes and commentary from the points of view of several other people. Birmingham implies in the text that these stories were contributed to him by others.

The film replaces the main narrator of the book (presumably Birmingham) with the new character Danny, and also creates the characters of Sam, Anya, and Flip largely from scratch. (In the book, it was Jeffrey whose death supplied the title.)

Thus, the romantic subplots are new to the film. Also, many of the main events of the film are not in the book, such as the Penthouse story line, the Pagan ritual, the trashing of the Queenslander by the skinheads, although a lot of these events do occur in 'The Tasmanian Babes Fiasco' which is the sequel to the novel on which the film is based. The credit fraud scheme was executed by a character not in the movie, Melissa the Junkie.

The number of characters and events is considerably pruned, condensed, and amalgamated in the film.

The book does have characters or aspects of characters used in the film, such as Taylor, Milo, Otis, Nina, Dirk, Iain the Socialist, Derek the Bank Clerk, Satomi Tiger, Uptight, and the Cashmere Sweater Babes and their Rugby Dudes.

See also
Cinema of Australia

References

External links
He Died with a Felafel in His Hand at the National Film and Sound Archive
 
He Died with a Felafel in His Hand at Oz Movies

2001 films
Australian comedy films
Films based on Australian novels
Films shot in Sydney
Films set in Sydney
Films set in Melbourne
Films set in Brisbane
Films shot in Brisbane
Films about neopaganism
2001 comedy films
2000s English-language films
Films directed by Richard Lowenstein